The chief god of the Chukchi peoples. In Chukchi religious lore, Nu'tenut lived in a house built of iron. His retinue of attendants included the spirits of the earth, of light and darkness, of the sea, the sun, the moon and the sky.

References

Siberian deities
Chukchi culture